Ayhika Mukherjee is an Indian (wb)  table-tennis player  and  has been selected to be part of the Indian team for the India at the 2018 Asian Games.

References 

Living people
Indian female table tennis players
Table tennis players at the 2018 Asian Games
Year of birth missing (living people)
Asian Games competitors for India
South Asian Games gold medalists for India
South Asian Games silver medalists for India
South Asian Games medalists in table tennis